Tura may refer to:

Places
India
Tura, Meghalaya, a municipality in India
Tura (Lok Sabha constituency), a parliamentary constituency in Meghalaya State
Roman Catholic Diocese of Tura, in Tura, Meghalaya

Russia
Tura, Russia, several rural localities
Tura Airport, a small airport in Krasnoyarsk Krai
Tura (river), a tributary of the Tobol in the Ural Mountains and Siberia

Other
Tura Beach, New South Wales, a community in Australia
Tura, Egypt, a town in Cairo Governorate, Egypt
Tura, Hungary, a city in Pest County, Hungary
Tura, alternative name of Tarreh Bakhakh Pardis, a village in Khuzestan Province, Iran
Turá, a village and municipality in Slovakia

Other
Tura (name)
Tura language

See also
Astictopterus tura, a butterfly
Chimgi-Tura, a medieval city of the Siberian Tatars
Mexichromis tura, a sea slug
Nizhnyaya Tura, a town in Sverdlovsk Oblast, Russia
Stará Turá, a town in Trenčín Region, Slovakia
Tura al-Gharbiya, a Palestinian town
Tura Magic F.C., a Namibian association football club
Tura Satana (band), an American alternative metal band
Verkhnyaya Tura, a town in Sverdlovsk Oblast, Russia